Saint-Laurent-de-Vaux is a former commune in the Rhône department in eastern France. It was annexed by the commune of Vaugneray on 1 January 2015.

References

Former communes of Rhône (department)